Jerry Gustave Hasford (November 28, 1947 – January 29, 1993), also known under his pen name Gustav Hasford was an American novelist, journalist and poet. His semi-autobiographical novel The Short-Timers (1979) was the basis for the film Full Metal Jacket (1987).  He was a United States Marine Corps veteran, who served as a war correspondent during the Vietnam War.

Biography

Early life
Born in Russellville, Alabama, Hasford joined the United States Marine Corps in 1966 and served as a combat correspondent during the Vietnam War. As a military journalist, he wrote stories for Leatherneck Magazine, Pacific Stars and Stripes, and Sea Tiger. During his tour in Vietnam, Hasford was awarded the Navy & Marine Corps Achievement Medal with Valor Device, during the Battle of Huế in 1968.

Early literary career
Hasford attended the Clarion Workshop and associated with various science fiction writers of the 1970s, including Arthur Byron Cover and David J. Skal. He had works published in magazines and anthologies such as Space and Time and Damon Knight's Orbit series. He also published the poem "Bedtime Story" in a 1972 edition of Winning Hearts and Minds, the first anthology of writing about the war by veterans. The poem was reprinted in Carrying the Darkness in 1985.

The Short-Timers
In 1978, Hasford attended the Milford Writer's Workshop and met veteran science fiction author Frederik Pohl, who was then an editor at Bantam Books. At Pohl's suggestion, Hasford submitted The Short-Timers, and Pohl promptly bought it for Bantam.

The Short-Timers was published in 1979 and became a best-seller, described in Newsweek as "[t]he best work of fiction about the Vietnam War". It was adapted into the feature film Full Metal Jacket (1987), directed by Stanley Kubrick. The screenplay by Hasford, Kubrick, and screenwriter Michael Herr was nominated for an Academy Award. Hasford's actual contributions were a subject of dispute among the three, and ultimately Hasford chose not to attend the Oscar ceremonies.

Library books theft charges
In 1985, Hasford had borrowed 98 books from the Sacramento, California public library but never returned them. An arrest warrant for misdemeanor grand theft was issued, but local authorities were unable to find him. In March 1988, shortly before the Academy Awards ceremony, campus police from California Polytechnic State University in San Luis Obispo, California found nearly 10,000 library books in his rented storage locker. At that time, he had 87 overdue books and five years of Civil War Times magazine issues checked out from the Cal Poly-SLO library; the materials were initially valued at $3,000 (it was later revalued at $20,000). 

Hasford's book collection included books borrowed (and never returned) from dozens of libraries across the United States, from libraries in Australia and the United Kingdom, and, allegedly, books taken from the homes of acquaintances. Among them were 19th-century books on Edgar Allan Poe and the American Civil War. Hasford had obtained borrowing privileges at Cal Poly-SLO as a California resident, using the residential address of a motel near campus and a false Social Security number.

In June 1988, he was charged with two counts of grand theft and ten counts of possession of stolen property. Judge Harry Woolpert of the San Luis Obispo County Superior Court scheduled the trial hearings to begin on December 5. During the trial, Hasford rearranged to plead guilty to possession of stolen property. On January 4, 1989, Hasford was sentenced to six months' imprisonment (of which he served three months) and promised to pay $1,100 in restitution from the royalties of his future works. He was also ordered to pay the shipping costs for the return of 748 books to nine libraries throughout the United States.

In a form letter addressed to friends and family, Hasford claimed that he wanted the books to research a never-published book on the Civil War. He described his difficulties as "a vicious attack launched against me by Moral Majority fanatics backed up by the full power of the Fascist State."

Second and third novels
In 1990, he published a second novel, The Phantom Blooper, which was a sequel to The Short-Timers. The sequel was intended to be the second installment of a "Vietnam Trilogy", but Hasford died before writing the third installment. Hasford's final novel titled A Gypsy Good Time, a hardboiled, noir detective story set in Los Angeles, was published in 1992.

Later life and death
Hasford, impoverished and suffering from untreated diabetes, moved to the Greek island of Aegina and died there of heart failure on 29 January 1993, aged 45. He is interred at Winston Memorial Cemetery in Haleyville, Alabama.

Books
Vietnam Trilogy
The Short-Timers (1979) 
The Phantom Blooper: A Novel of Vietnam (1990) 
 Unpublished

Standalone novel
A Gypsy Good Time (1992)

References

Further reading

External links

 Original version of the Gustav Hasford website containing an excerpt of A Gypsy Good Time

1947 births
1993 deaths
20th-century American novelists
American male novelists
United States Marine Corps personnel of the Vietnam War
People convicted of book theft
People from Russellville, Alabama
United States Marines
20th-century American male writers
American war correspondents of the Vietnam War